Teare is a surname of Manx origin.

People
Abby Sargent (née Teare; born 1977), Australian netball player
Anthony Teare, last person in the British Isles to be sentenced to death
Billy Teare, Irish storyteller
Cooper Teare (born 1999), American distance runner
Debra Teare (1955–2018), American artist
Donald Teare (1911–1979), British pathologist
Eddie Teare (born 1948), Manx politician
Ethel Teare (1894–1959), American silent film actress
James Teare (1872–1909), Manx merchant navy officer
Keith Teare (born 1954), American technology entrepreneur
Kevin Teare (born 1951), American artist
Nigel Teare (born 1952), Judge of the High Court of England and Wales
Scott A. Teare (born 1951), American Secretary General of the World Scout Committee

Manx-language surnames
Surnames of Manx origin